The 2010 Cooper Tires presents the U.S. F2000 National Championship powered by Mazda is the first U.S. F2000 National Championship season under the new management, sanctioned by the Indy Racing League.  All cars will run Mazda MZR engines built by former driver Steve Knapp.

With victory in the first race at the final round at Road Atlanta, Sage Karam won the championship and a fully funded seat in the 2011 Star Mazda Championship.

Drivers and teams

Race calendar and results
The schedule was announced on November 24, 2009. All championship rounds will be supporting the Star Mazda Championship. An exhibition meeting with two non-championship rounds will also be held at Mazda Raceway Laguna Seca over May 22–23, in support of the American Le Mans Series.

1Mazda Raceway Laguna Seca round was a non-points event run in conjunction with the Pacific F2000 Championship.

Championship standings

Drivers'

1Ardie Greenamyer switched from Championship to National class at ORP and was subsequently not shown in Championship class standings published by the league.

Teams'

References

External links
U.S. F2000 National Championship official website

U.S. F2000 National Championship seasons
U.S. F2000 National Championship